The Royal Horse Guards (Danish: Livgarden til Hest) was a Cuirassier regiment in the Royal Danish Army which was founded on orders from King Frederick III in January 1661 and discontinued on 31 May 1866. It served both as Royal Guards and as a front line cavalry unit.

History
The Royal Danish Horse Guards was founded on orders from King Frederick III in January 1661. They were based at Royal Horse Guards Barracks next to Copenhagen Castle.

The Royal Horse Guards played a particularly active role in the Battle of Helsingborg in 1710 and the Battle of Gadebusch in 1712 during the Great Northern War.

The regiment was disbanded on 31 May 1866. It had served both as Royal Guards and as a front line cavalry unit.

See also

 Royal Life Guards (Denmark)
 Guard Hussar Regiment Mounted Squadron

References

Danish Army regiments
Former guards regiments
1661 establishments in Denmark
Military units and formations established in 1661
Cavalry regiments of Denmark
Military of Denmark